In physics, Langevin dynamics is an approach to the mathematical modeling of the dynamics of molecular systems. It was originally developed by French physicist Paul Langevin. The approach is characterized by the use of simplified models while accounting for omitted degrees of freedom by the use of stochastic differential equations. Langevin dynamics simulations are a kind of Monte Carlo simulation.

Overview
A real world molecular system is unlikely to be present in vacuum. Jostling of solvent or air molecules causes friction, and the occasional high velocity collision will perturb the system. Langevin dynamics attempts to extend molecular dynamics to allow for these effects. Also, Langevin dynamics allows temperature to be controlled like with a thermostat, thus approximating the canonical ensemble.

Langevin dynamics mimics the viscous aspect of a solvent. It does not fully model an implicit solvent; specifically, the model does not account for the electrostatic screening and also not for the hydrophobic effect. For denser solvents, hydrodynamic interactions are not captured via Langevin dynamics.

For a system of  particles with masses , with coordinates  that constitute a time-dependent random variable, the resulting Langevin equation is  

Here,  is the Dirac delta.

If the main objective is to control temperature, care should be exercised to use a small damping constant . As  grows, it spans from the inertial all the way to the diffusive (Brownian) regime. The Langevin dynamics limit of non-inertia is commonly described as Brownian dynamics. Brownian dynamics can be considered as overdamped Langevin dynamics, i.e. Langevin dynamics where no average acceleration takes place.

The Langevin equation can be
reformulated as a Fokker–Planck equation that governs the probability distribution of the random variable X.

See also
 Hamiltonian mechanics
 Statistical mechanics
 Implicit solvation
 Stochastic differential equations
 Langevin equation
 Klein–Kramers equation

References

External links
 Langevin Dynamics (LD) Simulation

Classical mechanics
Statistical mechanics
Dynamical systems
Symplectic geometry